Kathryn Ann Gearlds (born October 26, 1984) is an American women's basketball coach and former forward, who is the current head coach of the Purdue Boilermakers. She is also the former women's basketball head coach of the Marian Knights. She played college basketball at Purdue for coaches Kristy Curry and Sharon Versyp from 2003 to 2007 and played in the Women's National Basketball Association (WNBA) for three seasons from 2007 to 2009.

High school
Gearlds was born in Beech Grove, Indiana and attended Beech Grove High School. In her four years, she compiled 2,521 career points, which ranked her fourth in Indiana history. She won numerous awards in her high school career, including being named Miss Basketball in 2003, after leading the Hornets to the 3A State Championship. Gearlds was also named a WBCA All-American, and participated in the 2003 WBCA High School All-America Game, where she scored ten points.  She was the MVP of the 2003 McDonald's All-American Game.

College 
Gearlds went on to star at Purdue University. She was named the Big Ten Freshman of the Year in 2004. In her four years as a Boilermaker, she compiled 14.8 points per game, 3.8 rebounds per game, and 3.0 assists per game. The team had a 103–30 record during her tenure. She earned the Big Ten tournament Most Outstanding Player honors in 2007 after Purdue defeated Ohio State in the Big Ten championship game.  She also won both the women's and overall State Farm College Three Point Championships on March 29, 2007, defeating male competitor and future NBA starter Aaron Brooks 17 to 16.

She graduated from Purdue in 2007 with a bachelor of science degree in sociology with a minor in psychology and communications.

Purdue statistics
Source

WNBA and overseas career 
On April 4, 2007, Gearlds was selected by the Seattle Storm with the seventh overall pick in the 2007 WNBA draft. In her rookie campaign, Gearlds appeared in 33 games for the Storm. She averaged 4.0 points per game, 1.6 rebounds per game, and 1.5 assists per game. She only played two more WNBA seasons (all with Seattle), appearing in 87 total games and averaging 4.4 points per game.

However, Gearlds playing career continued overseas. She spent two seasons (2011–12) in Spain as a professional player, and she also spent three years (2008–10) in Greece where she played and served as an assistant coach. She also spent some of 2007 in Slovakia as a player. In early 2013, she spent the year playing in Portugal and averaged 14.3 points per game for Alges where she was part of the league and cup championship teams.

Coaching career 
On July 16, 2013, Gearlds was named the head coach of the women's basketball team at Marian University.

In just her second season, Gearlds led the Knights to a 28–6 record, earning the program's second-ever NAIA Division II National Championship Tournament berth, and first Crossroads League title. In her third season, she led the Knights to a record of 32–6 (.842) and won the 2016 National title, the first in program history. The Knights repeated as National Champions in 2017, winning their final 23 games to finish with a school-record 35 wins.

On March 26, 2021; Purdue announced the 2021–2022 season will be the last year of the "Versyp Era" at Purdue, Gearlds joining the Boilermaker staff and then succeeding Sharon Versyp as the head coach in the Spring of 2022. The Journal & Courier reported on August 18, 2021 that Purdue University was investigating allegations that  Versyp created a “toxic and hostile environment,” including verbally attacking players and bullying a member of her coaching staff. It was announced on September 16, 2021 that Versyp would be retiring and replaced by Gearlds a year earlier than originally planned.

Head coaching record

External links 
WNBA profile
Purdue University profile
Marian University press release

References 

1984 births
Living people
All-American college women's basketball players
American women's basketball players
Basketball players from Indiana
Forwards (basketball)
Marian Knights women's basketball coaches
McDonald's High School All-Americans
Parade High School All-Americans (girls' basketball)
People from Beech Grove, Indiana
Purdue Boilermakers women's basketball players
Seattle Storm draft picks
Seattle Storm players